The South Sequoia League is a high school athletic league that is part of the CIF Central Section.  It is the athletic conference for public high schools in west and north Kern County.

Members
 Delano High School
 Shafter High School
 McFarland High School
 Taft Union High School 
 Cesar Chavez High School
 Wasco High School
 Robert F. Kennedy High School

References

CIF Central Section